Welchiodendron is a genus of plant in family Myrtaceae described as a genus in 1982. It contains only one known species, Welchiodendron longivalve, native to New Guinea and northern Queensland.

References

Monotypic Myrtaceae genera
Flora of New Guinea
Flora of Queensland